Barnard's Star is a small red dwarf star in the constellation of Ophiuchus. Its stellar mass is about 14% of the Sun's, and it has 20% of the Sun's diameter. Despite its proximity, the star has a dim apparent visual magnitude of +9.5 and is invisible to the unaided eye; it is much brighter in the infrared than in visible light.

The star is named after E. E. Barnard, an American astronomer who in 1916 measured its proper motion as 10.3 arcseconds per year relative to the Sun, the highest known for any star. The star had previously appeared on Harvard University photographic plates in 1888 and 1890.

Barnard's Star is among the most studied red dwarfs because of its proximity and favorable location for observation near the celestial equator. Historically, research on Barnard's Star has focused on measuring its stellar characteristics, its astrometry, and also refining the limits of possible extrasolar planets. Although Barnard's Star is ancient, it still experiences stellar flare events, one being observed in 1998.

Barnard's Star has been subject to multiple claims of planets that were later disproven. From the early 1960s to the early 1970s, Peter van de Kamp argued that planets orbited Barnard's Star. His specific claims of large gas giants were refuted in the mid-1970s after much debate. In November 2018, a candidate super-Earth planetary companion known as Barnard's Star b was reported to orbit Barnard's Star. However, work presented in July 2021 refuted the existence of this planet.

Naming 
In 2016, the International Astronomical Union organized a Working Group on Star Names (WGSN) to catalogue and standardize proper names for stars. The WGSN approved the name Barnard's Star for this star on 1 February 2017 and it is now included in the List of IAU-approved Star Names.

Description 
Barnard's Star is a red dwarf of the dim spectral type M4, and it is too faint to see without a telescope. Its apparent magnitude is 9.5.

At 7–12 billion years of age, Barnard's Star is considerably older than the Sun, which is 4.5 billion years old, and it might be among the oldest stars in the Milky Way galaxy. Barnard's Star has lost a great deal of rotational energy, and the periodic slight changes in its brightness indicate that it rotates once in 130 days (the Sun rotates in 25). Given its age, Barnard's Star was long assumed to be quiescent in terms of stellar activity. In 1998, astronomers observed an intense stellar flare, showing that Barnard's Star is a flare star. Barnard's Star has the variable star designation V2500 Ophiuchi. In 2003, Barnard's Star presented the first detectable change in the radial velocity of a star caused by its motion. Further variability in the radial velocity of Barnard's Star was attributed to its stellar activity.

The proper motion of Barnard's Star corresponds to a relative lateral speed of 90km/s. The 10.3 arcseconds it travels in a year amount to a quarter of a degree in a human lifetime, roughly half the angular diameter of the full Moon.

The radial velocity of Barnard's Star towards the Sun is measured from its blueshift to be −110km/s. Combined with its proper motion, this gives a space velocity (actual velocity relative to the Sun) of −142.6 ± 0.2km/s. Barnard's Star will make its closest approach to the Sun around 11,800 CE, when it will approach to within about 3.75 light-years.

Proxima Centauri is the closest star to the Sun at a position currently 4.24 light-years distant from it. However, despite Barnard's Star's even closer pass to the Sun in 11,800 CE, it will still not then be the nearest star, since by that time Proxima Centauri will have moved to a yet-nearer proximity to the Sun. At the time of the star's closest pass by the Sun, Barnard's Star will still be too dim to be seen with the naked eye, since its apparent magnitude will only have increased by one magnitude to about 8.5 by then, still being 2.5 magnitudes short of visibility to the naked eye.

Barnard's Star has a mass of about 0.14 solar masses, and a radius 0.2 times that of the Sun. Thus, although Barnard's Star has roughly 150 times the mass of Jupiter, its radius is only roughly 2 times larger, due to its much higher density. Its effective temperature is 3,100 kelvin, and it has a visual luminosity of 0.0004 solar luminosities. Barnard's Star is so faint that if it were at the same distance from Earth as the Sun is, it would appear only 100 times brighter than a full moon, comparable to the brightness of the Sun at 80 astronomical units.

Barnard's Star has 10–32% of the solar metallicity. Metallicity is the proportion of stellar mass made up of elements heavier than helium and helps classify stars relative to the galactic population. Barnard's Star seems to be typical of the old, red dwarf population II stars, yet these are also generally metal-poor halo stars. While sub-solar, Barnard's Star's metallicity is higher than that of a halo star and is in keeping with the low end of the metal-rich disk star range; this, plus its high space motion, have led to the designation "intermediate population II star", between a halo and disk star. Although some recently published scientific papers have given much higher estimates for the metallicity of the star, very close to the Sun's level, between 75 and 125% of the solar metallicity.

Search for planets

Astrometric planetary claims 
For a decade from 1963 to about 1973, a substantial number of astronomers accepted a claim by Peter van de Kamp that he had detected, by using astrometry, a perturbation in the proper motion of Barnard's Star consistent with its having one or more planets comparable in mass with Jupiter. Van de Kamp had been observing the star from 1938, attempting, with colleagues at the Sproul Observatory at Swarthmore College, to find minuscule variations of one micrometre in its position on photographic plates consistent with orbital perturbations that would indicate a planetary companion; this involved as many as ten people averaging their results in looking at plates, to avoid systemic individual errors.

Other astronomers subsequently repeated Van de Kamp's measurements, and two papers in 1973 undermined the claim of a planet or planets. George Gatewood and Heinrich Eichhorn, at a different observatory and using newer plate measuring techniques, failed to verify the planetary companion. Another paper published by John L. Hershey four months earlier, also using the Swarthmore observatory, found that changes in the astrometric field of various stars correlated to the timing of adjustments and modifications that had been carried out on the refractor telescope's objective lens; the claimed planet was attributed to an artifact of maintenance and upgrade work. The affair has been discussed as part of a broader scientific review.

Van de Kamp never acknowledged any error and published a further claim of two planets' existence as late as 1982; he died in 1995. Wulff Heintz, Van de Kamp's successor at Swarthmore and an expert on double stars, questioned his findings and began publishing criticisms from 1976 onwards. The two men were reported to have become estranged because of this.

Barnard's Star b 

In November 2018, an international team of astronomers announced the detection by radial velocity of a candidate super-Earth orbiting in relatively close proximity to Barnard's Star. Led by Ignasi Ribas of Spain their work, conducted over two decades of observation, provided strong evidence of the planet's existence. However, the existence of the planet was refuted in 2021, because the radial velocity signal was found to originate from a stellar activity cycle, and a study in 2022 confirmed this result.

Dubbed Barnard's Star b, the planet was thought to be near the stellar system's snow line, which is an ideal spot for the icy accretion of proto-planetary material. Direct imaging of the planet and its tell-tale light signature would have been possible in the decade after its discovery. Further faint and unaccounted-for perturbations in the system suggested there may be a second planetary companion even farther out.

Refining planetary boundaries 

For the more than four decades between van de Kamp's rejected claim and the eventual announcement of a planet candidate, Barnard's Star was carefully studied and the mass and orbital boundaries for possible planets were slowly tightened. M dwarfs such as Barnard's Star are more easily studied than larger stars in this regard because their lower masses render perturbations more obvious.

Null results for planetary companions continued throughout the 1980s and 1990s, including interferometric work with the Hubble Space Telescope in 1999.

In 2013, a research paper was published that further refined planet mass boundaries for the star. Using radial velocity measurements, taken over a period of 25 years, from the Lick and Keck Observatories and applying Monte Carlo analysis for both circular and eccentric orbits, upper masses for planets out to 1,000-day orbits were determined. Planets above two Earth masses in orbits of less than 10 days were excluded, and planets of more than ten Earth masses out to a two-year orbit were also confidently ruled out. It was also discovered that the habitable zone of the star seemed to be devoid of roughly Earth-mass planets or larger, save for face-on orbits.

Even though this research greatly restricted the possible properties of planets around Barnard's Star, it did not rule them out completely as terrestrial planets were always going to be difficult to detect. NASA's Space Interferometry Mission, which was to begin searching for extrasolar Earth-like planets, was reported to have chosen Barnard's Star as an early search target, however the mission was shut down in 2010. ESA's similar Darwin interferometry mission had the same goal, but was stripped of funding in 2007.

Therefore, it appears that Barnard's Star indeed does not host Earth-mass planets or larger, in hot and temperate orbits, unlike other M-dwarf stars that commonly have these types of planets in close-in orbits.

Stellar flares

1998
In 1998 a stellar flare on Barnard's Star was detected based on changes in the spectral emissions on 17 July during an unrelated search for variations in the proper motion. Four years passed before the flare was fully analyzed, at which point it was suggested that the flare's temperature was 8,000K, more than twice the normal temperature of the star. Given the essentially random nature of flares, Diane Paulson, one of the authors of that study, noted that "the star would be fantastic for amateurs to observe".

The flare was surprising because intense stellar activity is not expected in stars of such age. Flares are not completely understood, but are believed to be caused by strong magnetic fields, which suppress plasma convection and lead to sudden outbursts: strong magnetic fields occur in rapidly rotating stars, while old stars tend to rotate slowly. For Barnard's Star to undergo an event of such magnitude is thus presumed to be a rarity. Research on the star's periodicity, or changes in stellar activity over a given timescale, also suggest it ought to be quiescent; 1998 research showed weak evidence for periodic variation in the star's brightness, noting only one possible starspot over 130 days.

Stellar activity of this sort has created interest in using Barnard's Star as a proxy to understand similar stars. It is hoped that photometric studies of its X-ray and UV emissions will shed light on the large population of old M dwarfs in the galaxy. Such research has astrobiological implications: given that the habitable zones of M dwarfs are close to the star, any planet located therein would be strongly affected by solar flares, stellar winds, and plasma ejection events.

2019
In 2019, two additional ultraviolet stellar flares were detected, each with far-ultraviolet energy of 3×1022 joules, together with one X-ray stellar flare with energy 1.6×1022 joules. The flare rate observed to date is enough to cause loss of 87 Earth atmospheres per billion years through thermal processes and ≈3 Earth atmospheres per billion years through ion loss processes on Barnard's Star b.

Environment 

Barnard's Star shares much the same neighborhood as the Sun. The neighbors of Barnard's Star are generally of red dwarf size, the smallest and most common star type. Its closest neighbor is currently the red dwarf Ross 154, at a distance of 1.66 parsecs (5.41 light-years). The Sun and Alpha Centauri are, respectively, the next closest systems. From Barnard's Star, the Sun would appear on the diametrically opposite side of the sky at coordinates RA=, Dec=, in the westernmost part of the constellation Monoceros. The absolute magnitude of the Sun is 4.83, and at a distance of 1.834 parsecs, it would be a first-magnitude star, as Pollux is from the Earth.

Proposed exploration

Project Daedalus 

Barnard's Star was studied as part of Project Daedalus. Undertaken between 1973 and 1978, the study suggested that rapid, unmanned travel to another star system was possible with existing or near-future technology. Barnard's Star was chosen as a target partly because it was believed to have planets.

The theoretical model suggested that a nuclear pulse rocket employing nuclear fusion (specifically, electron bombardment of deuterium and helium-3) and accelerating for four years could achieve a velocity of 12% of the speed of light. The star could then be reached in 50 years, within a human lifetime. Along with detailed investigation of the star and any companions, the interstellar medium would be examined and baseline astrometric readings performed.

The initial Project Daedalus model sparked further theoretical research. In 1980, Robert Freitas suggested a more ambitious plan: a self-replicating spacecraft intended to search for and make contact with extraterrestrial life. Built and launched in Jupiter's orbit, it would reach Barnard's Star in 47 years under parameters similar to those of the original Project Daedalus. Once at the star, it would begin automated self-replication, constructing a factory, initially to manufacture exploratory probes and eventually to create a copy of the original spacecraft after 1,000 years.

See also 
 Kepler-42 – Nearly identical to Barnard's star, and hosts three sub-Earth sized planets.

Notes

References

External links 

 
 
  Amateur work showing Barnard's Star movement over time.
  Animated image with frames approx. one year apart, beginning in 2007, showing the movement of Barnard's Star.
 
 Barnard's Star in the Staracle Tycho catalog

Discoveries by Edward Emerson Barnard
High-proper-motion stars
M-type main-sequence stars
Ophiuchus (constellation)
BY Draconis variables
Stars with proper names
Ophiuchi, V2500
0699
BD+04 3561A
087937
?
Local Interstellar Cloud
Hypothetical planetary systems
J17574849+0441405